Damnation is the seventh full-length studio album by Swedish progressive rock band Opeth. It was released on 22 April 2003, five months after Deliverance, which was recorded at the same time. Damnation is the last Opeth album to date to be produced by Steven Wilson although he did mix two future albums, Heritage and Pale Communion. Mikael Åkerfeldt dedicated both albums to his grandmother, who died in a car accident during the time the albums were being recorded.

The album was a radical departure from Opeth's typical death metal sound, and the first Opeth album to use all clean vocals, clean guitars, and prominent Mellotron, as well as being inspired by 1970s progressive rock, which typically features no heavy riffs or extended fast tempos. Despite the change in style from Opeth's previous albums, Damnation was critically acclaimed and boosted their popularity, leading to the release of Lamentations on DVD in late 2003.

Production 
Like Deliverance, Damnation was recorded during the same trouble-plagued sessions at Nacksving Studios and Studio Fredman. The majority of the recording of both albums was done, save for most of the Damnation vocals. For those parts, Åkerfeldt flew down to Wilson's studio No Man's Land in the UK, just a day after his grandmother's funeral.

Critical reception 

In a rave review for Sputnikmusic, Mike Stagno wrote that Damnation is a progressive rock album that departs entirely from the extreme metal elements of Opeth's previous work, and stands as one of the best albums released in recent years. Ned Raggett of Pitchfork Media also felt that it succeeds without Opeth's previous death metal style, and showcases each band member's technical abilities on what is "the most surprising and entertaining album" in Opeth's discography.

In 2014, TeamRock put Damnation at number 91 on their "Top 100 Greatest Prog Albums of All Time" list commenting: "the first Opeth album to abandon metal entirely, Damnation trumped its heavier sibling Deliverance by bringing Mikael Åkerfeldt’s masterful songwriting to the fore".

Loudwire listed Damnation as the second best album of 2003. Mike Portnoy, ex-drummer for Dream Theater, put the album on his list of best albums of 2003.

Track listing

Notes
A music video was created for an edited version of "Windowpane".
The vocal melody in the chorus of "To Rid the Disease" is borrowed from a track recorded by Mikael Åkerfeldt's side project Sörskogen, "Mordet i Grottan".

Personnel

Opeth
Opeth – engineering
 Mikael Åkerfeldt – vocals and lead guitar 
 Peter Lindgren – rhythm guitar 
 Martín Méndez – bass guitar 
 Martin Lopez – drums

Additional personnel
Steven Wilson − keyboards, piano, mellotron, backing vocals, mixing, mastering, production, engineering
 Travis Smith – artwork

Charts

Weekly charts

Monthly charts

References

Opeth albums
2003 albums
Albums recorded at Studio Fredman
E1 Music albums
Albums with cover art by Travis Smith (artist)